Renée Carpentier-Wintz (1913–2003) was a French painter. She was the wife of French artist Raymond Wintz. Like her husband, she was famous for her beautiful Brittany landscapes.

Notes

External links
 Artnet Pictures of Renée Carpentier-Wintz's artworks.
 https://www.invaluable.com/artist/carpentier-renee-snls31w5ag

1913 births
2003 deaths
Modern painters
French women painters
20th-century French women artists